Lillingstone may refer to:

People
Luke Lillingstone (1653–1713), British Army general

Places
Lillingstone Dayrell, village in Buckinghamshire, England
Lillingstone Lovell, village in Buckinghamshire, England

See also
Lillingston, a surname